Emily Bolton (born 1951) is a Dutch actress raised in England and the Netherlands.

Career 
Bolton appeared in the James Bond film Moonraker in which she played 007's Brazilian contact Manuela. Originally she had wanted to become a concert pianist, but at the age of eighteen she chose to go to drama school.

She is also known for her TV appearances as a recurring cast member in: 
 Space: 1999 in which she played Operative June (uncredited).
 Tenko, the BBC prisoner of war drama in which she played Christina Campbell.
 Capital City in which she played Sylvia Roux Teng.

Her other TV credits include Survivors, Gangsters and Crossroads, and her other films include Percy's Progress (1974), Valentino (1977) and Empire State (1987).

She was credited as June Bolton in some of her early roles. In the book Tenko Reunion it is stated that she is no longer acting and has become an agent.

Filmography

References

External links

 Entry for June Bolton

British actresses
Aruban actresses
Living people
20th-century British actresses
1951 births
Dutch people of Aruban descent